Anolis sminthus, the mouse anole, is a species of lizard in the family Dactyloidae. The species is found in Honduras, Nicaragua, and El Salvador.

References

Anoles
Reptiles described in 1932
Reptiles of Honduras
Reptiles of Nicaragua
Reptiles of El Salvador
Taxa named by Emmett Reid Dunn